Local Angel is the fourth solo album by desert rock musician Brant Bjork. It is considered his most intimate and laid back record, mixing acoustic guitars and simple melodies.

Track listing

Credits
Produced by Brant Bjork and Tony Mason
Engineered by Tony Mason
Mastered by Mathias Schneeberger
Front cover angel by www.mistercartoon.com
Layout Bunker/Bjork for Dunart

Notes
 Local Angel CD releases feature two cover bonus tracks by Billy Roberts and the Ramones. The vinyl and digital versions don't feature either of these songs.
The initial material for the album was originally recorded on a cassette tape by Bjork in 2001. Bjork then recorded the material at Rancho De La Luna in 2003 with Molly McGuire and Dave Catching, before ultimately shelving the group's tapes and re-recording the album himself which would become the released version.
The album was re-released in 2018 with new artwork under Bjork's current label, Heavy Psych Sounds.

References

Brant Bjork albums
2004 albums